Dipendu Biswas (29 September 1981) is an Indian retired professional footballer, who is technical director of the I-League outfit Mohammedan Sporting Club. His father is from Bengal and his mother is from Kerala, Thalasseri, Kannur district. He graduated from the Tata Football Academy in 1996. He rejoined Mohun Bagan in 2012.

His earnings in 1998–1999 were reported to be Rs1.2 million and in 1999–2000 were Rs0.8 million. In 2011, he was one of a handful of players who were sold land by the government at subsidised prices because they had "made the state proud at national and international levels."

In 2014, he ran for election from Basirhat in West Bengal under the Trinamool Congress party ticket, and was defeated by Bharatiya Janata Party's candidate, Samik Bhattacharya. In the 2016 state assembly election he defeated Bhattacharya by more than 20,000 votes.

He joined Bharatiya Janata Party on 8 March 2021.

Honours
East Bengal
IFA Shield: 2000

Bengal
Santosh Trophy: 1996–97, 1998–99

Achievements
 Represented  Mohun Bagan AC as a forward from 2005 to 2007 and rejoined the club in 2012
 Played for East Bengal FC as a forward between 2007 and 2008
 In July 2020, Biswas became the football secretary of Mohammedan Sporting Club. In the 129-year history of the club, he is the first footballer who has been appointed a football secretary.

References

Living people
1981 births
People from Basirhat
Indian footballers
Footballers from West Bengal
Association football forwards
Mohun Bagan AC players
East Bengal Club players
Bharatiya Janata Party politicians from West Bengal
Trinamool Congress politicians from West Bengal